Portal is an unincorporated community in Cochise County, Arizona, United States. Often called the Yosemite of Arizona, the rock walled canyon is composed of fused volcanic tuff.

The community is a popular location for birding in southeastern Arizona.  It is also home to the American Museum of Natural History's Southwest Research Station. The ranch of Sally and Walter R. Spofford was a popular birdwatching destination before closing in 2002. Other notable residents include the writer Nancy Farmer and her husband. The Arizona Sky Village astronomy community is located in Portal, because the skies in the area are free of light pollution and therefore extremely dark.

Climate
Typical of upland Arizona, Portal has a semi-arid climate (Köppen BSk) with warm to hot days followed generally by quite cool nights. Frequent frosts in winter give way to mild days, whilst most rain comes from summer thunderstorms.

References

External links
 Portal, Arizona
 Arizona Sky Village

Unincorporated communities in Cochise County, Arizona